Roel Janssen (born 16 June 1990 in Venlo) is a Dutch professional footballer who plays as a centre back for Fortuna Sittard in the Eredivisie. He formerly played for VVV-Venlo.

External links
 

1990 births
Living people
Association football fullbacks
Dutch footballers
Footballers from Venlo
Fortuna Sittard players
VVV-Venlo players
Eredivisie players
Eerste Divisie players